The organization Foreign Policy Interrupted (FPI) was launched in 2014 to address the disparity between female and male foreign policy expert representation in the media. According to the Op-Ed Project, in 2011, women authored only 19 percent of op-eds in The Wall Street Journal, 22 percent in The New York Times, and 24 percent in the Los Angeles Times. In collaboration with Media Matters for America, FPI conducted an analysis of foreign policy guests on major news programs. In 2014, 22 percent of guests were women, and trained female foreign policy experts received less coverage than that.

To increase the number of female voices in foreign policy journalism, FPI designed a fellowship program, which includes media training and meaningful mentoring at partnering media institutions, including Foreign Affairs and Foreign Policy. In addition, FPI publishes a weekly newsletter that highlights foreign policy articles authored by women and interviews of female foreign policy experts.

FPI is led by co-founders Elmira Bayrasli and Lauren Bohn.

FPI Fellowship Recipients 

As of early 2017, there have been four classes of fellows.

Inaugural Class
 Mira Rapp-Hooper
 Manal Omar
H. Nanjala Nyabola
 Jen Weedon

Second Class
 Yolande Bouka
 Cori Crider
 Elina Ribakova
 Irene S. Wu

Third Class
 Séverine Autesserre
 Kamissa Camara
 Kate Himes
 Maria Snegovaya
Fourth Class
 Anne-Marie Brady
 Asha Bastleberry
 Alice Driver
 Lauren Kosa
 Fabiana Perera
 Elizabeth Radin
 Erin Stuckey

References

http://blogs.cfr.org/zenko/2014/01/16/meet-foreign-policy-interrupted
http://www.vox.com/2015/2/16/8039675/foreign-policy-interrupted
http://www.ipsnews.net/2015/02/debating-u-s-foreign-policy-where-are-the-women/

External links
 Official website
Foreign policy and strategy think tanks